WMQR (96.1 FM) is a hot adult contemporary formatted broadcast radio station licensed to Broadway, Virginia, serving the Harrisonburg/Staunton area. WMQR is owned and operated by Saga Communications, through licensee Tidewater Communications, LLC.

History
The station was first took the callsign WLTK on June 16, 1988 and officially launched on December 18, 1989, carrying a Contemporary Christian format, branded as "Light 96".

On August 8, 2001, WLTK swapped callsigns and formats with WBHB-FM at 103.3 FM, becoming an Oldies format, branded as "Magic 96.1". The station played music from the 1950s through the 1970s.

On February 7, 2005, WBHB-FM yet again swapped callsigns and formats with WJDV at 105.1 FM, becoming a Light Adult Contemporary format, branded as "Lite Rock 96.1". WBHB-FM remained on 105.1 FM until December 1, 2008 when the callsign was changed to WTGD. On September 17, 2007, WJDV changed its branding from "Lite Rock 96.1" to "96.1 Lite FM; Lite Favorites Full of Variety".

In early November 2011, WJDV yet again changed its branding to "Mix 96-1", though on November 23, the branding was changed again to "A Fresh Mix; Fresh 96-1".  Then, on the week of November 28, the station's branding was again switched to simply "96.1 WJDV" with the fresh961.com and 961litefm.com websites were redirected to sister WQPO's website.  On the week of December 4, the "Fresh 96-1" branding and fresh961.com website were back. During the holiday season, WJDV changed to an all Christmas music format through Christmas Day. During that time, it was known as "Christmas in the Valley".

On July 31, 2015, WJDV changed its callsign to WMQR while the sale of Verstandig Broadcasting of Harrisonburg to Saga Communications was closed the same day at a purchase price of $9.64 million. Three days later at 7:00 A.M. on August 3, the station segued from Light Adult Contemporary to Hot Adult Contemporary, formatted "More 96-1; More Music, More Fun". On the same date and time, its sister station, WTGD changed to Classic Hits as "Rewind 105-1" as well as the callsign.

References

External links
 More 96-1 Online
 

MQR
Radio stations established in 1989
Mainstream adult contemporary radio stations in the United States